Aulanko Castle is an ancient hillfort located in Hämeenlinna, Tavastia Proper, Finland. The Iron Age residence and the cemetery are also known near the castle. The Aulanko Castle has developed a diverse and nationally significant cultural environment, which is complemented by the Aulanko Nature Reserve established in the ridge area.

See also 
 Hakoinen Castle
 Häme Castle

References

External links 

 Official site: Sights in Aulanko Nature Reserve at Nationalparks.fi

Archaeological sites in Finland
Buildings and structures in Kanta-Häme
Castles in Finland
Hämeenlinna
Hill forts
History of Kanta-Häme
Scenic viewpoints